Featherbedding is the practice of hiring more workers than are needed to perform a given job, or to adopt work procedures which appear pointless, complex and time-consuming merely to employ additional workers. The term "make-work" is sometimes used as a synonym for featherbedding.

The term "featherbedding" is usually used by management to describe behaviors and rules sought by workers. The term may equally apply to mid- and upper-level management, particularly in regard to top-heavy and "bloated" levels of middle- and upper-level management. Featherbedding has also been occasionally used to describe rent-seeking behavior by corporations in response to economic regulation.

Etymology
The term "featherbedding" originally referred to any person who is pampered, coddled, or excessively rewarded. The term originated in the use of feathers to fill mattresses in beds, providing for more comfort.  The modern use of the term in the labor relations setting began in the United States railroad industry, which used feathered mattresses in sleeping cars. Railway labor unions, confronted with changing technology which led to widespread unemployment, sought to preserve jobs by negotiating contracts which required employers to compensate workers to do little or no work or which required complex and time-consuming work rules so as to generate a full day's work for an employee who otherwise would not remain employed.

In a 1965 bulletin the United States Department of Labor referred to "featherbedding" as:

Since the mid-19th century, "featherbedding" has been most commonly used in the labor relations field. Increasingly, the term has come to refer only to work rules or collective bargaining agreements demanded by labor unions.

In nations where trade union activities are legally defined, legal definitions of featherbedding exist.  These definitions are few in number, and tend to be narrowly drawn. For example, the Taft-Hartley Act in the United States defines featherbedding in Section 8(b)(6) as any agreement or union demand for payment of wages for services which are not performed or not to be performed. However, in 1953, the Supreme Court of the United States ruled that the Act's definition only applies to payments for workers not to work. Therefore, work rules requiring minimum crew sizes, the assignment of duties to craft workers, and other "make-work" agreements do not constitute featherbedding.

Economics
Featherbedding is commonly seen by economists as a solution to "who should bear the burden of technological change?"

Labor economists often argue that featherbedding can be construed as the most economically optimal position from both an employer's and employee's perspective, since it can be seen as distributing the costs of technological change. Featherbedding only emerges under certain circumstances. Chief among these is that the employer has an exploitable surplus (e.g., profit) to support the practice. Featherbedding also arises where market forces fail and organizations are permitted to be noncompetitive. Under this analysis, corporations (for example) are already inefficient and featherbedding does not make them more or less so. Featherbedding can, in some circumstances, take excess resources (profits) away from the employer and give them to workers in the form of more income per worker or higher numbers of employees at the same income level. Featherbedding is considered economically efficient because it occurs in the give-and-take of collective bargaining.  If employers were relatively strong vis-a-vis unions, unions would be unable to impose featherbedding on them. As the politico-socio-economic strength of each party changes over time, collective bargaining outcomes will as well, enlarging or reducing the number and impact of featherbedding rules on the employer.

More recent political analyses of featherbedding have concluded that featherbedding is not necessarily economically optimal, but is better than other forms of bargaining. Under this analysis, the best form of collective bargaining would be one in which the union and employer bargain not only over wages but the level of employment. Most unions in the United States, for example, bargain solely over wages. Bargaining over work rules (featherbedding) as well as wages achieves outcomes close to those reached by bargaining solely over wages, but is better than bargaining over wages alone.

Non-economic perspectives
Legal scholars and certain social theorists argue that featherbedding may be an expression of the concept of a job as a property right. These analysts argue that while the owner or employer has the "right" to extract profit because of his or her investment of capital, so the worker has the "right" to extract profit because of his or her investment of labor. Featherbedding, it is argued, arises and becomes a significant problem in places where the job property right is not part of the legal regime and remains unprotected (such as the United States).

Seizing on economists' emphasis on power in the workplace, other social theorists conclude that featherbedding is a result of weak labor unions and unenforced and unprotected worker rights.  Under this analysis, featherbedding is a response by unions to their weakness, not strength.

Improved workplace employment rights, improved economic policies and less antagonistic labor-management relations, it is argued, would reduce featherbedding.

Others see certain kinds of featherbedding as a corrective for market failures.  For example, the delivery of social services is often not quantifiable except in the extreme. When the market is unable to quantify a good or service, the market will fail to accurately price it. Market failure results. In complex organizations, or in those whose inputs and outputs are difficult to quantify, it becomes increasingly difficult to determine what constitutes featherbedding. For example, defining "quality health care" is problematic, as is defining a "quality education". In such situations, frontline professional workers place heavy emphasis on work rules and minimums.  Many white-collar professionals (in particular those such as nurses and teachers) and highly skilled craft workers place heavy emphasis on staffing minimums, for example, as a means of ensuring a "high quality" outcome. While some argue that this is an exercise in the professional judgment of such workers, others call this featherbedding and point to the low level of evidence that such rules improve outcomes.

International perspectives

Brazil
In Brazil, featherbedding is considered endemic in government-owned and private-sector industries. Some analysts argue that featherbedding is a reaction to economic insecurity, and helps stabilize the national economy by spreading wealth.

France
In France, featherbedding was encouraged by the nationalized rail transportation system after World War Two with a view to keeping down the unemployment rate. This was in addition to railway express rates being kept very low. The railroad ran at a huge deficit as a result.

Japan
In post-war Japan, featherbedding is uncommon. A post-war consensus emerged among labor unions that featherbedding was not in the best interest of workers, and unions in Japan have tended to avoid the practice. A heavy government emphasis on full employment and a strong social safety net helped reinforce this consensus.

Sweden
There are no national, regional, or local statutes or regulations governing labor unions in Sweden. Sweden has no national bureau or agency overseeing or regulating labor relations, and no agency monitors or regulates internal trade union matters. Nevertheless, despite relatively close relationships between employers and unions, featherbedding is almost unknown in Sweden.

United Kingdom
In the United Kingdom, featherbedding is also referred to as "overmanning".

United States
In the U.S., the Taft-Hartley Act defines and outlaws featherbedding. However, as previously noted, the U.S. Supreme Court has narrowly defined featherbedding, leaving most practices undisturbed.

References

Business terms
Labor relations
Corruption